Tarabuco is a Bolivian town in the department of Chuquisaca, capital of the Yamparáez Province and its first section, Tarabuco Municipality. It is best known as the home of the Yampara culture. Its people host the Pujllay festival in March each year.  Members of the local indigenous community gather for Mass, parade in their colorful traditional costumes, drink plenty of chicha, and celebrate.

Each Sunday, a colourful and vibrant open-air market attracts locals and tourists alike.  Many people wear traditional Yampara costumes, which not only preserve their identity but also advertise their location of origin within the area to others within the Tarabuco area.

See also
Oroncota, Yampara settlement and Inca fortress.

References 
 Nystrom, Andrew, "Lonely Planet Bolivia," Lonely Planet 2004, pp. 227–228.
 Murphy, Alan, "Footprint Bolivia Handbook: The Travel Guide," 3rd ed., 2002, pp. 260–261.
 World-Gazetteer
 Reglamento de supervisión del acceso a las Autonomías Indígena Originario Campesinas

External links 
 Map of Yamparáez Province
 Tarabuco recompone su Asamblea Autonómica para viabilizar las observaciones al estatuto
 Tarabuco y Huacaya recibieron resoluciones del TSE para continuar su autonomía indígena

Populated places in Chuquisaca Department

it:Tarabuco